John Green (1881–1968) was a rugby union international who represented England from 1905 to 1907, and played for Skipton RFC. He also captained his country.

Early life
John Green was born on 17 September 1881 (in Skipton?).

Rugby union career
Green made his international debut on 11 February 1905 at Mardyke, Cork in the Ireland vs England match.
Of the 8 matches he played for his national side he was on the winning side on 3 occasions.
He played his final match for England on 16 March 1907 at Rectory Field, Blackheath in the England vs Scotland match.

References

1881 births
1968 deaths
English rugby union players
England international rugby union players
Rugby union forwards
Rugby union players from Skipton
Skipton RFC players